While other nations have Marines who are aviators, only the United States Marine Corps has its own dedicated aviation arm. Most squadrons have changed names and designations many times over the years so they are listed by their final designation.

Squadron designations

The basic tactical and administrative unit of United States Marine Corps Aviation is the squadron. Fixed-wing aircraft squadrons (heavier than air) are denoted by the letter "V," which comes from the French verb "Voler" (to fly). Rotary wing (helicopter) squadrons use "H." Marine squadrons are always noted by the second letter "M." Squadron numbering is not linear as some were numbered in ascending order and others took numbers from the wing or the ship to which they were assigned. From 1920 to 1941, Marine flying squadrons were identified by one digit numbers. This changed on July 1, 1941 when all existing squadrons were redesignated to a three-digit system. The first two numbers were supposed to identify the squadrons parent group but with the rapid expansion during the war and frequent transfer of squadrons this system fell apart.

Decommissioned squadrons
Squadrons are listed by their designation at the time they were decommissioned.

Pre–World War II squadrons
Following World War I, Marine aviation was significantly reduced from 8 to 3 squadrons. Many of the squadrons were renamed and re-designated numerous times and many still exist today with other designations. The squadrons listed below reflect those squadrons that were decommissioned prior to World War II and were never reconstituted in any form.

Marine Reserve Scouting Squadrons
The Marine Aviation Reserve was inactive from 1918 through 1928. When it was reconstituted, the names and aircraft used by these squadrons changed frequently but their home duty stations remained constant. The aircraft for these squadrons were assigned to the reserve bases themselves and were shared with co-located Navy Reserve squadrons. The squadrons were absorbed into the 1st and 2nd Marine Aircraft Wings and their identities lost when they were mobilized in December 1940.

Marine Barrage Balloon Squadrons
Squadrons flying lighter than air vehicles (balloons), were indicated by the letter Z in naval squadron designation. The first use of balloons by the Marine Corps was during World War I when they were used for artillery spotting. After the outbreak of World War II, the Navy authorized the Marine Corps to create barrage balloon squadrons for the air defense of advanced naval bases.  Balloon training was cancelled in the summer of 1943 and the remaining units were decommissioned by the end of the year.

Marine Balloon Observation Squadron
ZK-1M was formed in 1924 and disbanded in 1929.

Marine Scout Bombing Squadrons
Scout bombing squadrons each had eighteen to twenty-four Douglas SBD Dauntless dive bombers and were tasked with conducting dive-bombing attacks and long range scouting and patrol missions. They also provided close air support, laid smoke screens and sprayed DDT around bases. The majority of these squadrons were quickly decommissioned following the end of World War II although three entered the Marine Air Reserve for a short period.

Marine Torpedo Bombing Squadrons
VMTBs were torpedo bomber squadrons that operated the Grumman TBF Avenger. They were in service with the Marine Corps during World War II and were decommissioned shortly after the war. They were part of the Cactus Air Force on Guadalcanal, served on escort carriers during the campaign to retake the Philippines and provided close air support for Australian forces on Borneo and Marines during the Battle of Okinawa.

Marine Fighting Squadrons
Marine Fighting Squadrons were multirole squadrons responsible for air-to-air combat, combat air patrols, attacking enemy shipping, escorting bombers and close air support.  By far the most numerous of any type of Marine Corps squadron, they first made their mark flying the Grumman F4F Wildcat as part of the Cactus Air Force on Guadalcanal and finished World War II flying the venerable Vought F4U Corsair. Many VMF squadrons continued to operate after the war with most in the Marine Air Reserve; however, with the retirement of the Vought F-8 Crusader the VMF squadrons either became VMFAs or were decommissioned.

Marine Night Fighter Squadrons
After witnessing the Royal Air Force's success using radar directed fighters at night in 1941, the Navy's Bureau of Aeronautics authorized eight Marine night fighter squadrons to be formed by 1945. This timeline was brought forward considerably after the attack on Pearl Harbor and their need proven by the frustration of the Cactus Air Force's pilots not being able to engage Japanese bombers at night during the Battle of Guadalcanal. This led to the formation of  VMF(N)-531 in November 1942. After much deliberation the Lockheed PV-1 Ventura was picked as the first choice of aircraft for these squadrons. The night fighting squadrons featured radar equipped aircraft, ground-based radar and personnel that provided Ground-controlled interception (GCI). The VMF(N) designated squadrons were decommissioned after the war, those that weren't were re-designated VMF(AW).

Marine Bombing Squadrons
The Marine Bombing Squadrons were formed during World War II to fill the need for a long range, land based bomber that could be used against enemy shipping and submarines. In the Pacific Theater, the squadrons served ashore as a garrison air force to attack bypassed Japanese bases and other installations. The VMBs flew the North American PBJ-1 Mitchell, which was the naval version of the U.S. Army Air Forces' B-25 Mitchell. Sixteen of these squadrons were commissioned with seven serving in combat, four never able to leave the U.S. due to the war ending and four others converted to VMTB squadrons. The seven PBJ squadrons that saw combat in the Pacific suffered the loss of 45 aircraft, 26 in combat and 19 in non-combat operations, and 173 crew: 62 officers and 111 enlisted men.

Marine Operational Training Squadrons
All of these squadrons were activated as Marine Training Squadrons (MTS) at Marine Corps Air Station Edenton, North Carolina in January 1944 and were redesignated as Marine Operational Training Squadrons (MOTS) and transferred to Marine Corps Air Station Cherry Point, North Carolina in February 1945 as medium bomber pilot training units. They instructed Marines learning to fly the North American PBJ-1 Mitchell. Following the end of the war they were quickly decommissioned.

Marine Photographic Squadrons
Marine photographic squadrons were first formed in 1942 and went through numerous name changes while they were active. VMDs/VMPs flew photographic modified versions of the Douglas SBD Dauntless, Consolidated PB4Y-1 Liberator, Consolidated PB4Y-2 Privateer and Grumman F7F Tigercat. The main mission of these squadrons was to conduct long range, very high-altitude photographic reconnaissance.

Marine Glider Squadron
The Marine Corps established a glider program in April 1942. Eventually they set goals of having 10,800 Marines qualified as glider infantry, with 1,371 gliders and 3,436 pilots. They originally operated from Page Field on MCRD Parris Island but later moved to Marine Corps Air Station Eagle Mountain Lake outside Dallas, Texas. The program was disbanded in 1943 when it was determined that glider assaults into small, heavily fortified, jungle islands would be tactically unfeasible.

Marine Transport Squadrons
Flying the Douglas R4D Skytrain and the Curtiss R5C-1 Commando, these squadrons were responsible for moving troops and cargo, aerial resupply, delivery of Paramarines, and medical evacuation. The last of these squadrons was decommissioned in 1949.

Marine Scouting Squadrons
There were three Marine Scouting Squadrons prior to World War II; however, VMS-3 was the only squadron to retain the designation. The squadron served in Haiti from 1919 through 1934 and then spent its last ten years at St. Thomas, Virgin Islands. During World War II they were the only Marine Corps squadron to operate east of the United States. They began the war flying the Grumman J2F Duck, transitioned to the Naval Aircraft Factory/Vought OS2N Kingfisher and at the time of deactivation were flying SBD Dauntless dive bombers.

Marine Target Towing Detachments
Marine Target Towing detachments were first formed at Marine Corps Air Station Ewa in October 1944. They were responsible for towing targets for antiaircraft gunnery and radar tracking practice. They flew Martin JM-1 Marauders and the Curtiss R5C-1 Commandos. The last of these detachments was decommissioned in March 1946.

Marine Observation Squadrons
The Marine observation squadrons were formed during the latter stages of World War II with the primary mission of forward air control of strike aircraft for close air support and air interdiction. They saw extensive service during the Vietnam War flying the North American OV-10 Bronco. The Marine Corps began decommissioning the VMO squadrons following their participation in Operation Desert Storm as turboprop-driven aircraft were being perceived in the wake of that conflict as being too vulnerable to surface-to-air missiles, especially shoulder-launched man-portable air defense systems (MANPADS), to fly over modern battlefields. Their mission has been assumed by the VMFA(AW) squadrons flying the F/A-18D Hornet.

Marine Attack Squadrons
In 1951, the Marine Corps began fielding the Douglas AD-1 Skyraider ground attack aircraft which had as its main role close air support for the Marines on the ground. Thus many squadrons had their designation changed from VMF to VMA to reflect this ground attack role. 13 squadrons were equipped with the Skyraider until they were finally phased out in 1958. Follow on VMA squadrons operated the A-4 Skyhawk during the Vietnam War through their retirement just after Operation Desert Storm. The VMA tradition is carried on today by squadrons flying the AV-8B Harrier II.

Marine Tactical Electronic Warfare Squadrons
VMAQ squadrons operated the EA-6B Prowler and were tasked with providing electronic attack, electronic counter-countermeasures, radar jamming and suppression of enemy air defense using the AN/ALQ-99 jamming pod and the AGM-88 HARM.  Each of the four squadrons operated five aircraft and were land-based, although they were capable of landing on board U.S. Navy aircraft carriers.  VMAQ-2 decommissioned on March 8, 2019 marking the end of active service for the VMAQs and the EA-6B Prowler.

Marine Reconnaissance Squadron
Marine Reconnaissance Squadron 4 was the only reserve photographic reconnaissance squadron in the Marine Corps. Initially based in Naval Air Station New Orleans, Louisiana they moved to Naval Air Station Olathe, Kansas May 1, 1967 and then again to Naval Air Station Dallas, Texas in 1970 when the reserves were reorganized. They flew Vought RF-8A Crusader until 1969 when all the planes were replaced with the Vought RF-8G Crusader.

Marine Composite Reconnaissance Squadrons
Following the Korean War Marine Composite Squadron 1 (VMC-1) and Marine Photographic Squadron 1 (VMJ-1) were combined to form VMCJ-1. The new squadron was responsible for both Photoreconnaissance and Electronic Warfare. In its early years it flew the Vought RF-8A Crusader and Douglas EF-10B Skyknight but these were later replaced by the McDonnell-Douglas RF-4B Phantom II and the Grumman EA-6A Electric Intruder. The squadron was decommissioned following the end of the Vietnam War and the reorganization of the Marine Corps' composite community in 1975.

Marine Tactical Reconnaissance Squadron
Upon the decommissioning of the Marine Composite Squadrons (VMCJs), VMFP-3 became the lone photographic reconnaissance squadron in the Marine Corps. They flew the McDonnell-Douglas RF-4B Phantom II and operated from 1975 until being decommissioned in 1990. Their capability has since been replaced by various targeting pods used on Marine aircraft and the Advanced Tactical Airborne Reconnaissance System which is found in some of the McDonnell-Douglas F/A-18 Hornet squadrons.

Marine Fighter Attack Squadrons
The first Marine Corps squadron to be redesignated a VMFA was in June 1962 upon receipt of the first McDonnell-Douglas F-4 Phantom II aircraft. VMF and VMA squadrons were redesignated because the new Phantoms could be both fighter aircraft and ground attack aircraft. These squadrons were heavily deployed during the Vietnam War. Most of these squadrons would eventually convert to the McDonnell-Douglas F/A-18 Hornet with the last F-4 Phantom leaving service in 1992. The end of the Cold War saw the deactivation of some VMFA squadrons as part of the overall drawdown of the US Military

Marine All-Weather Fighter Attack Squadron

Marine Heavy Helicopter Squadrons

Marine Medium Helicopter Squadrons
The original Marine Medium Helicopter squadrons flew the Sikorsky UH-34D Sea Horse, which shortly after its inception saw extensive combat during the Vietnam War. Beginning in 1966 they began to be replaced with the CH-46 Sea Knight which was faster, could carry more troops and is still in service today. The decommissioned HMM squadrons reflect the UH-34D training squadron and various reserve squadrons.

Marine Light Helicopter Squadrons

Marine Light Attack Helicopter Squadrons
The Marine Corps’ light attack squadrons (HMLAs) are composite squadrons usually made up of 12 Bell AH-1Z Cobras and 6 Bell UH-1Y Hueys.  The primary missions of the Cobra is close air support, forward air control, reconnaissance and armed escort, while the Huey provided airborne command and control, utility support, supporting arms coordination and medical evacuation.  These squadrons were first formed during the Vietnam War with the fielding of the Bell AH-1 Cobra gunship and its being combined in the same squadron with the UH-1H Iroquois that initially belonged to the Marine Corps' VMO squadrons.  The  majority of these squadrons are still active in the Fleet Marine Force today.

Marine Medium Tiltrotor Squadron
Marine tiltrotor squadrons operate the MV-22 Osprey with their main mission being assault support. The Osprey offers twice the speed, five times the range, and can fly more than twice as high as the CH-46 Sea Knight it replaced.  The Marine Corps has 18 operational Osprey squadrons as of April 2018.

Training squadrons

See also

 United States Marine Corps Aviation
 List of United States Marine Corps battalions
 List of United States Marine Corps aircraft wings
 List of active United States Marine Corps aircraft squadrons

Notes

References
Bibliography

Web

 USMC Aviation homepage
 Marine Corps Aviation Association
 Marine Corps Aviation Reconnaissance Association
 Maritime Quest - Military Abbreviations, Nicknames and Slang Terms
 United States Marine Corps aviation squadrons
 Fleet Marine Force status - August 31, 1944
 9th MAW Unit History

Decommissioned Aircraft squadrons

Marine Corps aircraft squadrons